Patricia A. Dowling is an American politician and jurist who is a justice of the Ipswich District Court.

Early life
Dowling was born on December 10, 1957 in Lawrence, Massachusetts. She attended Skidmore College and Suffolk University Law School.

Political career
Dowling served on the Massachusetts Governor's Council from 1995 to 2001. Concurrently, from 1998 to 2001 she was Mayor of Lawrence, Massachusetts. In 2000, she was defeated in her bid for reelection by Mary-Ellen Manning in Democratic primary.

Judicial career
In 2001, Dowling was appointed to the Ipswich District Court and resigned as Mayor.

References

1957 births
Living people
Massachusetts state court judges
Mayors of Lawrence, Massachusetts
Women mayors of places in Massachusetts
Members of the Massachusetts Governor's Council
Skidmore College alumni
Suffolk University Law School alumni
American women judges
21st-century American politicians
21st-century American women politicians